Muslimbagh railway station, previously known as Hindubagh railway station, is located in town of Muslim Bagh, Killa Saifullah District, Balochistan, Pakistan.

See also
 List of railway stations in Pakistan
 Pakistan Railways

References

Railway stations in Killa Saifullah District
Railway stations on Zhob Valley Railway Line